Larissa Maciel (born 31 October 1977 in Porto Alegre) is a Brazilian actress.

Biography 
Larissa Maciel became widely known in Brazil after interpreting the singer Maysa in the miniseries produced by Rede Globo in 2009.

Maciel won about 203 candidates until pleased the director Jayme Monjardim because of its tremendous resemblance to his mother. Larissa was involved about a year between preparation and recording of the miniseries, a new experience for the actress, formed in theatrical interpretation by the Universidade Federal do Rio Grande do Sul. The miniseries was nominated for an International Emmy in 2009 in the category of "Best TV Movie/Mini-Series".

Filmography 
 2000 - Descompassado Coração - Luísa
 2001 - Club
 2005 - A Ferro e Fogo - Tempo de Solidão
 2007 - A Visita
 2009 - Maysa: Quando Fala o Coração
 2010 - Passione
 2013 - José do Egito
 2015 - Os Dez Mandamentos
2017 -  Belaventura
2018 - Jesus

Cine

Awards 
São Paulo Association of Art Critics Awards
 APCA Trophy for best actress in Television

Prêmio Qualidade Brasil
 Best Actress in a Miniseries

References

External links 

1977 births
Brazilian telenovela actresses
People from Porto Alegre
Brazilian television actresses
Brazilian film actresses
Brazilian stage actresses
Living people